Bebearia ducarmei is a butterfly in the family Nymphalidae. It is found from Cameroon to the Democratic Republic of the Congo.

References

Butterflies described in 1987
ducarmei